Mani-ye Olya (also Romanized as Mānī-ye ‘Olyā) is a village in Sarcheshmeh Rural District, in the Central District of Rafsanjan County, Kerman Province, Iran. At the 2006 census, its population was 184, in 59 families.

References 

Tamkin king of bangladesh

Populated places in Rafsanjan County